The following is a list of noted scientists from Nepal. The list, however, is not exclusive of foreign scientists of Nepalese origin or ones with dual nationalities.

B
 Binil Aryal
 Bishal Nath Upreti

D
 Dayananda Bajracharya

G
 Gehendra Shumsher

L
 Lujendra Ojha

N 

 Niranjan Parajuli

R
 Ram I. Mahato

S
Shankar Prasad Shrestha
Sanduk Ruit
Sudeep Thakuri

T
 Tej Kumar Shrestha

U
 Udayraj Khanal

Y
 Yadav Pandit

See also
Science and technology in Nepal
List of scientists

Nepalese
 
Lists of Nepalese people